A Grateful People is the last album released by Christian duo Watermark. It was recorded live on August 25, 2005 in front of a small audience at their hometown church in Brentwood, Tennessee. It was released on March 14, 2006 by Rocketown Records.

Track listing
All songs written by Christy and Nathan Nockels, except where noted.
 "Take Me There" – 3:06
 "The Glory of Your Name" – 4:11
 "A Grateful People/Bless the Lord" (Andrae Crouch, Christy Nockels, Nathan Nockels) – 6:09
 "Gloria/Friend for Life" (David Bell, Louie Giglio, Christy Nockels, Nathan Nockels, Rob Padgett) – 5:23
 "Who Am I? (Grace Flows Down)" – 5:47
 "Glory Baby" – 4:43
 "More Than You'll Ever Know" – 3:48
 "Arise and Be Comforted" – 5:04
 "In the Garden (There Is None Like You)" – 3:58
 "Knees to the Earth" – 4:00
 "The Purest Place" – 4:08
 "Captivate Us" (Charlie Hall, Christy Nockels, Nathan Nockels) – 5:32
 "Light of the World" – 4:44
 (Untitled Track) (known as Elliana's Song) – 6:54

Awards
The album was nominated for two Dove Awards: Inspirational Album of the Year and Praise & Worship Album of the Year, at the 38th GMA Dove Awards.

Chart performance
The album peaked at #24 on Billboard's Christian Albums and #28 on Heatseekers. The song "Light of the World" also peaked at #10 on Billboard's Christian Songs.

References

External links
A Grateful People on Amazon

2006 live albums
Watermark (band) albums